The Kauri Museum is in the west coast village of Matakohe, Northland, New Zealand.
The museum, to the south of the Waipoua Forest, contains many exhibits that tell the story of the pioneering days when early European settlers in the area extracted kauri timber and kauri gum.

The museum has over 4000 sq metres of undercover exhibits, including the largest collection of kauri gum in the world, and the largest collection of kauri furniture. It has a model of a 1900s kauri house with furniture and models in the dress of the early years, and an extensive collection of photographs and pioneering memorabilia. 
On the wall, there are full-scale circumference outlines of the huge trees, including one of 8 metres, larger even than Tane Mahuta.
The museum includes a working mock-up of a steam sawmill.

It tells its story from the colonial viewpoint, and presents its representation of the kauri gum industry as part of the process of creating the New Zealand identity. It has little to say about negative aspects, such as the impact on the Māori people.

The Kauri Museum has however helped raise awareness of the need to conserve the remaining forest through a display of photographs by the conservationist Stephen King, presented in partnership with the Waipoua Forest Trust.

References

External links

 The Kauri Museum
 (1 min 3 secs, 6.1 million+ views)

Natural history museums in New Zealand
Kaipara District
Museums in the Northland Region
History of the Northland Region
Local museums in New Zealand
Forestry in New Zealand
Forestry museums
Kauri gum